Sansom Park is a city in Tarrant County, Texas, United States. Its population was 4,686 at the 2010 census.

Geography

Sansom Park is located at  (32.803780, –97.402820).

According to the United States Census Bureau, the city has a total area of 1.2 sq mi (3.2 km2), all of it land.

Demographics

2020 census

As of the 2020 United States census, there were 5,454 people, 1,511 households, and 1,000 families residing in the city.

2000 census
As of the census of 2000,  4,181 people, 1,422 households, and 1,052 families were residing in the city. The population density was 3,376.8 people per sq mi (1,301.8/km2). The 1,491 housing units averaged 1,204.2/sq mi (464.3/km2). The racial makeup of the city was 81.25% White, 0.43% African American, 1.00% Native American, 0.57% Asian, 14.69% from other races, and 2.06% from two or more races. Hispanics or Latinos of any race were 28.22% of the population.

Of the 1,422 households, 36.1% had children under the age of 18 living with them, 51.1% were married couples living together, 15.6% had a female householder with no husband present, and 26.0% were not families. About 22.2% of all households were made up of individuals, and 8.8% had someone living alone who was 65 or older. The average household size was 2.87, and the average family size was 3.36.

In the city, theage distribution was 28.9% under 18, 10.0% from 18 to 24, 28.2% from 25 to 44, 20.2% from 45 to 64, and 12.7% who were 65 or older. The median age was 34 years. For every 100 females, there were 96.5 males. For every 100 females age 18 and over, there were 91.1 males.

The median income for a household in the city was $28,714, and for a family was $31,122. Males had a median income of $25,221 versus $21,544 for females. The per capita income for the city was $11,836. About 18.0% of families and 23.0% of the population were below the poverty line, including 33.3% of those under age 18 and 13.0% of those age 65 or over.

Education
Most of Sansom Park is served by the Castleberry Independent School District. A small portion of the city is served by the Lake Worth Independent School District.

References

External links
 City of Sansom Park official website 
 Sansom Park Police Department

Cities in Tarrant County, Texas
Cities in Texas
Dallas–Fort Worth metroplex